Fonsecaea is a genus of fungi in the family Herpotrichiellaceae. The type species, Fonsecaea pedrosoi, is associated with the disease chromoblastomycosis.

References

Eurotiomycetes genera
Eurotiomycetes